The 1968–69 Macedonian Republic League was the 25th since its establishment. Teteks Tetovo won their 2nd championship title.

Participating teams

Final table

External links
SportSport.ba
Football Federation of Macedonia 

Macedonian Football League seasons
Yugo
3